Marcus Sedgwick (8 April 1968 – 15 November 2022) was a British writer and illustrator. He authored several young adult and children's books and picture books, a work of nonfiction and several novels for adults, and illustrated a collection of myths and a book of folk tales for adults. According to School Library Journal his "most acclaimed titles" were those for young adults. 

His novels  Floodland (2001) won the Branford Boase Award and The Dark Horse (2002) was shortlisted for The Guardian Children's Fiction Prize. The first U.S. edition of his 2011 novel Midwinterblood won the 2014 Michael L. Printz Award from the American Library Association.

Early life
Marcus Sedgwick was born 8 April 1968 in Preston, a small village in East Kent, England. He has one brother, Julian, and a half-sister, Ellie. As a child he was shy and recalled being bullied at Sir Roger Manwood's School in Sandwich, Kent an all-boys grammar school.

His mother had once worked in Machynlleth at the Centre for Alternative Technology; the area was the setting for Susan Cooper's fantasy series The Dark Rising, and Sedgwick called those books influential for him. He was also influenced by Mervyn Peake’s Gormenghast series, which his father had introduced him to.

He studied mathematics and politics at the University of Bath. His father died when Sedgwick was twenty years old.

Career 
Before becoming a full-time author, Sedgwick worked as a bookseller at Heffers, a children's bookstore, and in sales at children's publishers Ragged Bears and Walker Books. According to The Guardian he began writing "seriously" in 1994. 

His first book, Floodland, was published in 2000, and it received the Branford-Boase award for the best debut children's novel of that year. Floodland tells the story of Zoe, who lives on her own on an island that used to be part of England before global warming caused the seas to rise. Publishers Weekly said that "Despite some page-turning chapters, Zoe and her story lack the credibility to sustain readers through the contradictory themes and sometimes unimaginative prose." Alternative Magazine said it was "a stunning debut novel that precluded more literary brilliance to follow." 

Dark Horse (2001) was shortlisted for several awards. My Swordhand is Singing (2006) won a Booktrust award.

In 2013 he released Dark Satanic Mills, a graphic novel written in conjunction with his brother Julian Sedgwick and illustrated by John Higgins. His 2015 book The Ghosts of Heaven, a work of young adult fiction consisting of four loosely connected parts combined into an "intriguing" novel, according to Sarah McCarry writing for The New York Times. 

He won numerous awards for his writing, most notably the Michael L. Printz Award in 2011 for Revolver, 2014 for The Ghosts of Heaven, and 2016 for Midwinter Blood. At the time of his death he was the most-nominated author for America’s most prestigious book prize for writing for young adults. In addition to writing, Sedgwick worked on film and book projects with his brother Julian. He was represented by RCW Literary Agency.

Sedgwick taught creative writing at Bath Spa University as a writer in residence from 2011 through 2014 and wrote reviews for the Guardian newspaper.

Reception 
Kirkus in reviewing his 2016 Saint Death called out his "characteristic precision of English prose". According to The Guardian, after the 2006 appearance of My Swordhand is Singing, his works were "regularly on the shortlist for every major award for his subsequent titles", and although seldom receiving major awards were "always critically acclaimed, much admired by other writers and popular with readers".

Awards 
 2001 Branford Boase Award – Floodland
 2001 Edgar Allan Poe Awards nomination – Witch Hill
 2007 North East Teenage Book Award  – The Foreshadowing
 2007 Portsmouth Book Award – The Foreshadowing
 2007 Booktrust Teenage Prize – My Swordhand Is Singing
 2007 Renfrewshire Book Award –  My Swordhand Is Singing
 2011 Blue Peter Award (Best Book with Pictures) – Lunatics and Luck
 2013 Rotherham Book Awards (Lower Age Category) – Fright Forest
 2014 Michael L. Printz Award – Midwinterblood
 2015 Essex Book Award – She Is Not Invisible
 2015 Oxfordshire Book Award – She Is Not Invisible
 2015 Rib Valley Book Award – She Is Not Invisible
 2015 Spellbinding Book Award – She Is Not Invisible
 2016 Michael L. Printz Honor – The Ghosts of Heaven

Personal life 
Sedgwick was married and divorced three times. He had a daughter, Alice, with his first wife Kate Agnew.

In addition to drawing and writing, Sedgwick played the drums and was an avid music lover. Some of his favorite writers include Susan Cooper, Thomas Mann and Arthur Schnitzler.

In 2014, Sedgwick was diagnosed with chronic fatigue syndrome, also known as myalgic encephalomyelitis. After his diagnosis, he moved to the French Alps and then to Dordogne. His final work before his death was the nonfiction book All In Your Head: What Happens When Your Doctor Doesn’t Believe You? Sedgwick died in France on 15 November 2022, at the age of 54.

Publications

Young adult novels 
 Floodland (Delacorte Press, 2000) 
 The Dark Horse (Wendy Lamb Books, 2001) 
 The Foreshadowing (Orion Children's Books, 2005) 
 Blood Red, Snow White (Orion Children's Books, 2007) 
 Revolver (Orion, 2009) 
 White Crow (Orion, 2010) 
 Midwinterblood (Indigo, 2011) 
 She Is Not Invisible (Orion Children's Books, 2013) 
 The Ghosts of Heaven (Roaring Brook Press, 2015) 
 Killing the Dead (Indigo, 2015) 
 Saint Death (Orion Children's Books, 2016) 
   Snowflake, AZ (Norton Young Readers, 2019) 
   Dark Peak (Oxford University Press, 2021) 
   Wrath (Barrington Stoke, 2022)

Dead Days 

 The Book of Dead Days (Orion, 2003) 
 The Dark Flight Down (Orion Children's Books, 2004) ã

Swordhand 

 My Swordhand Is Singing (Orion Children's Books, 2006) 
 The Kiss of Death (Orion Children's Books, 2008)

Children's books 

 Witch Hill (Delacorte Books for Young Readers, 2001) 
 A Winter's Tale. Illustrated by Simon Bartram. (Templar, 2003)

Raven Mysteries 

 Food and Fang (Orion Children's Books, 2009) 
 Ghosts and Gadgets (Orion Children's Books, 2009)  
 Lunatics and Luck (Orion Children's Books, 2010)  
 Vampires and Volts (Orion Children's Books, 2010)  
 Magic and Mayhem (Orion Children's Books, 2011)  
 Diamond and Doom (Orion Children's Books, 2011)

Cudweed 

 Cudweed's Birthday (Hachette Children's Group, 2011) 
 Cudweed in Outer Space (Hachette Children's Group, 2012) 
 Cudweed's Time Machine (Hachette Children's Group, 2013)

Elf Girl and Raven Boy 

 Fright Forest (Orion Children's Books, 2012)  
 Monster Mountains (Hachette Children's Group, 2012) 
 Scream Sea (Orion Children's Books, 2013)  
 Dread Desert (Hachette Children's Group, 2013)  
 Terror Town (Hachette Children's Group, 2014) 
 Creepy Caves (Orion Children's Books, 2015)

Picture books 

A Christmas Wish (Dutton, Penguin, 2003) 
 The Emperor's New Clothes. Jay Alison, illustrator (Chronicle Books, 2004)

Graphic novels 

Dark Satanic Mills with Julian Sedgwick. Illustrated by Marc Olivent and John Higgins (Walker Books, 2013) 
Scarlett Hart: Monster Hunter (First Second Books, 2018) 
Voyages in the Underworld of Orpheus Black with Julian Sedgwick. (Walker Books, 2019)

Adult novels 

 A Love Like Blood (Pegasus Books, 2015) 
 Mister Memory (Mulholland Books, 2016) 
 The Monsters We Deserve (Zephyr, 2018)

Nonfiction 

 Cowards: The True Story of the Men Who Refused to Fight, London  (Hodder Children's Books, 2003) 
 Snow. Illustrated by Marcus Sedgwick (Little Toller Books, 2016) 
 Be the Change – Be Calm: Rise Up and Don’t Let Anxiety Hold You Back (Summersdale, 2022) 
 All In Your Head: What Happens When Your Doctor Doesn’t Believe You? (Bennion Kearny Limited, 2022)

Short stories and novellas 

 "bad language" in Thirteen (Orchard Books, 2005) 
 "The Heart of Another" in The Restless Dead: Ten Original Stories of the Supernatural. Deborah Noyes, editor. (Candlewick Press, 2007) 
 "The Spear of Destiny" in Doctor Who: Eleven Doctors, Eleven Stories. (Puffin, 2013) 
 "Don't Call It Glory" in The Great War: Stories Inspired by Items from the First World War (Candlewick Press, 2015)  
 "If Only in My Dreams" in I'll Be Home for Christmas (Stripes Publishing, 2016) 
 "Together We Win". 10 Stories to Make a Difference. Daniel Ido, illustrator. (PopUp Projects, 2021)

As illustrator 
 Outremer: Jaufré Rudel and the Countess of Tripoli – A Legend of the Crusades. Nick Riddle, editor. (Fisher King, 1993) 
 Counsel, June. Once upon Our Time (Glyndley Books, 2000)

References

External links

 
 
 
 Story behind A Love Like Blood – essay by Marcus Sedgwick

1968 births
2022 deaths
English children's writers
British writers of young adult literature
Michael L. Printz Award winners
20th-century English novelists
20th-century English male writers
21st-century English novelists
21st-century English male writers
People from Kent
People educated at Sir Roger Manwood's School